TC-1698 is a drug developed by Targacept which acts as a partial agonist for the α7 subtype of neural nicotinic acetylcholine receptors. It has neuroprotective effects in animal studies, and has been used as a lead compound to find further potent derivatives.

See also
 Anabasine

References 

Nicotinic agonists
Stimulants
3-Pyridyl compounds